Gongora ilense is a species of orchid found in Ecuador.

References

ilense
Orchids of Ecuador